Virginia United FC may refer to:

 Virginia United FC (Australia), an Australian soccer team
 Virginia United FC (United States), an American soccer team

See also
 Northern Virginia United FC, an American soccer team